This is a list of members of the Tasmanian Legislative Council between 1915 and 1921. Terms of the Legislative Council did not coincide with Legislative Assembly elections, and members served six year terms, with a number of members facing election each year.

Elections

Members

Notes
  On 13 October 1919, Richard McKenzie, the member for Westmorland, died. John Cheek was elected unopposed on 15 November 1919.
  On 30 October 1920, Arthur Loone, the member for South Esk, resigned to contest a seat in the Australian Senate under the Nationalist banner. He was unsuccessful, and was re-elected unopposed to his Council seat.
  On 8 November 1920, Ellis Dean, the member for Derwent, died. Louis Shoobridge (senior) won the resulting by-election on 3 February 1921.

Sources
 
 Parliament of Tasmania (2006). The Parliament of Tasmania from 1856

Members of Tasmanian parliaments by term
20th-century Australian politicians